The 2011–12 West Midlands (Regional) League season was the 112th in the history of the West Midlands (Regional) League, an English association football competition for semi-professional and amateur teams based in the West Midlands county, Shropshire, Herefordshire, Worcestershire and southern Staffordshire. It has three divisions, the highest of which is the Premier Division, which sits at step 6 of the National League System, or the tenth level of the overall English football league system.

Premier Division

The Premier Division featured 18 clubs which competed in the division last season, along with four new clubs:
Black Country Rangers, promoted from Division One
Malvern Town, relegated from the Midland Football Alliance
Pegasus Juniors, relegated from the Hellenic Football League
Sporting Khalsa, promoted from Division One

League table

References

External links
 West Midlands (Regional) League

2011–12
10